Foral Democratic Union (UDF) was an electoral alliance in Navarre, formed by the People's Democratic Party (PDP), the Liberal Party and the Foral Democratic Party ahead of the 1987 Navarrese regional election. It merged into the Navarrese People's Union (UPN) in 1991.

References

Political parties in Navarre
Political parties established in 1987
Political parties disestablished in 1991
Defunct political party alliances in Spain
1987 establishments in Spain
1991 disestablishments in Spain